Tuan Ibrahim bin Tuan Man (Jawi: توان إبراهيم بن توان من) is a Malaysian politician, lecturer and teacher who served as the Minister of Environment and Water for the second term in the Barisan Nasional (BN) administration under former Prime Minister Ismail Sabri Yaakob from August 2021 to the collapse of the BN administration in November 2022 and the first term in the Perikatan Nasional (PN) administration under former Prime Minister Muhyiddin Yassin from March 2020 to the collapse of the PN administration in August 2021. He has served as the State Leader of the Opposition of Pahang since December 2022, Member of Parliament (MP) for Kubang Kerian since May 2018, Member of the Pahang State Legislative Assembly for Cheka since November 2022 and for Jengka from November 1999 to March 2004 and Deputy President of the Malaysian Islamic Party (PAS), a component party of PN coalition, since June 2015.

Early life
Tuan Ibrahim was born on 27 August 1960 in Kampung Batu Balai, Jerantut, Pahang to ethnic Kelantanese Malay parents. He then furthered his undergraduate studies at the National University of Malaysia and received a Bachelor of Arts (Honors) Degree in Leadership. He later went on to study his postgraduate studies at the same university and graduated in 1995. His undergraduate thesis is entitled Travel Implications for Muslims - A Study in Tioman Island. He emphasized the three benefits of his research, in terms of land, in terms of benefit to the people and in terms of Islamic morality. He has served as a teacher at Sekolah Menengah Kebangsaan (SMK) Clifford in Kuala Lipis and served as a senior lecturer for 14 years at the University of Technology MARA (UiTM) in Jengka, Pahang and Manjung, Perak.

Political career
Tuan Ibrahim is an alim (Islamic religious scholar). He contested and won the Pahang State Legislative Assembly seat of Jengka in the 1999 election. However, in the 2004 election, he was unseated amid a nationwide swing to the Barisan Nasional coalition. He tried to reclaim the seat in the 2008 and 2013 elections, but lost on each occasion to a Barisan Nasional candidate. In 2013 he became a vice-president of PAS, defeating Mahfuz Omar in an election at the party's annual general assembly. He has been the head of the party in the state of Pahang since 2004.

In 2018, Tuan Ibrahim was elected as MP of Kubang Kerian constituency in the 14th Malaysian general election.

In April 2021, the media report titled Malaysia is not impacted by climate change, says the minister , in which Tuan Ibrahim is the Minister of Environment and Water, has caused anger online. Tuan Ibrahim said that the headline is misleading and clarified Malaysia is not invited to the Leaders Summit on Climate in the United States because it is not classified as a country that is highly vulnerable to the impacts of climate change.

In November 2021, Tuan Ibrahim made the local headlines when he delivered his speech in Malay during the 2021 United Nations Climate Change Conference in Glasgow. Some criticized him with the assumptions that he was not able to speak English fluently while others including politician from the opposition block coming to his defense and praised him for dignifying the national language.

Election results

Honours
  :
 Knight Companion of the Order of the Crown of Pahang (DIMP) – Dato' (1998)
  Grand Knight of the Order of Sultan Ahmad Shah of Pahang (SSAP) – Dato' Sri (2020)
  :
  Knight Grand Commander of the Order of the Life of the Crown of Kelantan (SJMK) – Dato' (2022)

See also

 Kubang Kerian (federal constituency)

Participation in International Platform

1. Delivered the National Statement on behalf of the Government of Malaysia at the 26th COP conference  in Glasgow using Bahasa Melayu entirely to uphold the national language.
2. Lead the Malaysian delegation to the High Level Segment Negotiation Session at UNFCCC COP-26 which took on 31 October to 12 November 2021.
3. Lead the Ministerial delegation to the High Level Segment Meeting of the Conferences of the Parties to the Basel, Rotterdam and Stockholm Conventions in Stockholm, Sweden. Several discussions on global environmental pollution crisis through the full implementation of the Basel, Rotterdam and Stockholm Conventions as well as life cycle management issues for chemicals and waste. Through this conference, Malaysia also supports sustainable financing as well as the fair distribution of resources among member countries, including the use of new and more innovative technologies.
4. Signed the Memorandum of Understanding relating to Climate Change with His Excellency Lord Zac Goldsmith, Minister for the Environment of the United Kingdom at the Foreign, Commonwealth and Development Office, London. The meeting also discussed the actions which have been implemented by Malaysia in dealing with climate change as well as other issues such as the country's aspirations towards net zero emissions as early as 2050, LT-LEDS, COP-26 commitments, the development of the National Adaptation Plan and low carbon initiatives and current implementation planned in the 12th RMK.
5. Received courtesy visits from foreign counterparts such as His Highness Tuan Masagos Zulkifli, Minister of Social and Family Development, Singapore, His Highness Sameh Hassan Shoukry, Minister of Foreign Affairs, Egypt, His Highness Naseer Ahamed Minister of Environment, Sri Lanka. Apart from that, he also received courtesy visits from Ambassadors and High Commissioners to Malaysia such as TYT Lee Chi Beom, Ambassador of the Republic of Korea to Malaysia, PYT Dr. Petra Ponevacs-Pana, Ambassador of Hungary to Malaysia, HRH Ragai Tawfik Said Nasr, Ambassador of Egypt to Malaysia, HRH Hermono, Ambassador of Indonesia to Malaysia, HRH Takahashi Katsuhiko, Ambassador of Japan to Malaysia and HRH Brian D. McFeeters Ambassador of the United States to Malaysia. These courtesy visits discussed the cooperation that can be implemented by both countries in the field of environmental management, climate change agenda and water management.

References

Living people
1960 births
People from Pahang
Malaysian Muslims
Malaysian people of Malay descent
Malaysian Islamic Party politicians
People from Kelantan
Members of the Pahang State Legislative Assembly
Members of the Dewan Rakyat
21st-century Muslim scholars of Islam
